Ugong is a highly urbanized barangay located in the northwestern portion of Pasig. Today, barangay Ugong is further subdivided into south which is part of Pasig, while the northern boundary of Ugong, Ugong Norte, is under Quezon City.

Education 
 Francisco Legaspi Memorial School
 St. Paul College Pasig
 Reedley International School
 Domuschola International School
 Ugong Pasig National High School

Attractions 
 Arcovia City
 Silver City
 SM Center Pasig
 Tiendesitas
 The Grove by Rockwell
Metrowalk

Barangays of Metro Manila
Pasig